Lemche may refer to:

Henning Mourier Lemche (1904–1977), Danish zoologist
Kris Lemche (born 1978), Canadian actor
Matt Lemche, Canadian actor
Niels Peter Lemche (born 1945), Danish biblical scholar